USS Charles Whittemore (ID-3232) was a four masted lumber schooner used as a decoy ship against German U-boats during World War I.

History
Charles Whittemore was built by Michael B. McDonald and Sons of Mystic, Connecticut.  She was launched on September 21, 1905, six weeks after McDonald's shipyard went into receivership.  Her original owner was F. P. Boggs of Boston.  Her first master was Captain S. H. Perry.  She was originally employed in the lumber trade between South Carolina and Nova Scotia.

On March 13, 1918 Charles Whittemore lost her rudder in a storm off of Block Island, Rhode Island.  The former Spanish cruiser USS Don Juan de Austria was sent from the Naval Station in Newport, Rhode Island to tow Charles Whittemore to Newport where was taken into service and commissioned in the United States Navy.

At this point, the single greatest naval threat to the United States was German U-boats.  As effective anti-submarine methods had not yet been developed, many novel approaches were used.  In the case of Charles Whittemore it was decided that she would resume her role as an innocuous merchant ship in the hopes that she would become a target for U-boats.  As Charles Whittemore was a relatively small sailing vessel, it was likely that a U-boat commander would not consider her worth a torpedo.  Instead, it was hoped, a submarine would surface and attempt to sink Charles Whittemore with its deck gun.  In anticipation of this eventuality, Charles Whittemore would be towing a submarine on the theory that the submarine could sink the U-boat before Charles Whittemore would be sunk.

USS Charles Whittemore was commissioned on 9 August 1918.

The schooner cleared New London 15 August 1918 towing the submarine USS N-5 (SS-57) bound for the shipping lanes in the North Atlantic where it was hoped German submarines would attack a seemingly defenseless ship. Since no contact was made with the enemy, and N-5 broke loose during a storm, Charles Whittemore returned to New London on 9 September.  She later conducted a similar mission with the submarine USS L-8 without encountering a hostile submarine.

Continuing her service with the Atlantic Submarine Force, the Charles Whittemore carried submarine supplies, vital spare parts, and other cargo between New York, Newport, New London, Bermuda, and Charleston, S. C., until 14 May 1919 when she returned to New York from Hampton Roads to be sold. She was decommissioned and transferred to her new owner 20 May 1919.

Charles Whittemore later was damaged by fire and a storm off Cape Cod on 11 January 1927, and abandoned at sea.

References

Bibliography

External links
 Photo gallery at NavSource.org

1905 ships
Ships built in Mystic, Connecticut
World War I patrol vessels of the United States